Luis Diego Arnáez Villegas (born 6 November 1967) is a retired Costa Rican football player who is currently manager of Municipal Grecia.

Club career
A midfielder, Arnáez made his professional debut on 2 August 1987 for Puntarenas against Ramonense and he scored his first senior goal on 14 February 1988 against San Carlos. After almost 200 games for Puntarenas he left for Alajuelense where he would play over 400 matches. His trophies for Alajuelense included 7 league titles and the 2004 CONCACAF Champions' Cup, when Alajuelense defeated rival Deportivo Saprissa in the two-leg final.

His final game was on 23 April 2005, against Pérez Zeledón.

International career
Nicknamed el Flaco (the Skinny one), he made his debut for the national team in an April 1991 friendly match against Mexico, collecting a total of 31 caps and scoring 9 goals. Arnáez appeared in seven of Costa Rica's qualifying matches for the 1994 FIFA World Cup, as well as two qualifiers for the 1998 FIFA World Cup. He also represented Costa Rica at the 1997 UNCAF Nations Cup and in the 1998 CONCACAF Gold Cup, playing against Cuba and the United States. Upon Alajuelense's triumph in the 2004 CONCACAF Champions' Cup, he was recalled to the national team at the age of 36 by coach Jorge Luis Pinto. His final cap came in a 2-5 loss in World Cup qualifying against Honduras on 18 August 2004.

International goals
Scores and results list Costa Rica's goal tally first.

Managerial career
Later, Arnáez coached the first division team Puntarenas in his home country. After getting fired from the team, he coached Liga Deportiva Alajuelense for 6 months. He then had a spell as an assistant coach for the Costa Rica national football team and was appointed manager of Herediano in December 2009 but returned to Puntarenas in March 2014.

References

External links
 
 

1967 births
Living people
People from Guanacaste Province
Association football midfielders
Costa Rican footballers
Costa Rica international footballers
1998 CONCACAF Gold Cup players
2000 CONCACAF Gold Cup players
Puntarenas F.C. players
L.D. Alajuelense footballers
Costa Rican football managers
L.D. Alajuelense managers
C.S. Herediano managers
Liga FPD players
Copa Centroamericana-winning players
Puntarenas F.C. managers
Municipal Grecia managers